Pride of Performance (Urdu: تمغۂ حسنِ کارکردگی) Award is a civil award given by the Government of Pakistan to Pakistani citizens in recognition of distinguished merit in the fields of literature, arts, sports, medicine, or science for civilians.

1990

1991

1992

1993

1994

1995

1996

1997

1998

1999

References

Civil awards and decorations of Pakistan